Fort Thomas may refer to a place in the United States:

Fort Thomas, Arizona, an unincorporated community
Fort Thomas, Kentucky, a city and former army post

See also
Fort Thomas, Tangasseri, a ruined fortification in Kerala, India